"Tina Marie" is a popular song. It was written by Bob Merrill and was published in 1955, and performed by Perry Como with an accompaniment with Mitchell Ayres and His Orchestra with The Ray Charles Singers.

Recordings
On June 21, 1955, Perry Como recorded the song for RCA Victor.The recording was released on a number of singles:
In the United States, by RCA Victor, as a 78rpm single (catalog number 20-6192), and a 45 rpm single (catalog number 47-6192), with the flip side "Fooled."
In the United States, as a children's record by RCA Victor, as a 78rpm single (catalog number BY-50), and a 45 rpm single (catalog number WBY-50), with the flip side "Round and Round," part of the Children's Bluebird Series
In Belgium, by RCA as a single (catalog number 18313), with the flip side "Fooled."
In the United Kingdom, by HMV, in October 1955, as a 78rpm single (catalog number POP-103), with the flip side "Home for the Holidays." This record reached position number 24 on the UK chart. (A pirate version was issued by HMV as a 45rpm single under the catalog number 7M-326.)
In Australia, The Book - Top 40 Research, 7th edition compiled by Barnes & Scanes, gives that Tina Marie was never released as a single in Australia. The same publication then goes on to show Tina Marie achieving Number 8 on the Australian music charts on January 21, 1956.

Chart performance
In the US, "Tina Marie" reached position number 5 on the Billboard chart.

References

Songs written by Bob Merrill
1955 songs